Perfect Self is the debut album by the American rock band Stereomud. It was released on May 22, 2001 through Loud Records and was manufactured via Columbia Records. The album met with moderate commercial success, with its two singles, "Pain" and "Steppin Away", both featuring their own music videos. The album sold more than 100,000 units in the US.

Musically, the album has been described as hard rock with metal influences, similar in style to that of Sevendust (bassist Corey Lowery is younger brother to Clint Lowery of Sevendust and Dark New Day). The album's sound varies from rock and metal-based songs, as vocalist Erik Rogers also varies between clean tone singing and the traditional screaming found in metal music.

The album is listed as having a total of 23 tracks (which was a "lucky" number for Lowery); however, 10 of these tracks are listed as "[untitled track]". These tracks are small electronica-based interludes that are variations of the final track, "Perfect Self", which is a blend of acoustic and electronica.

"Don't Be Afraid" was featured in the soundtrack for the video game ATV Offroad Fury 2.

Track listing

Credits 
Erik Rogers – vocals
Corey Lowery – bass, vocals
Joey Zampella – guitar
John Fattoruso – guitar
Dan Richardson – drums

Production
 Produced by Don Gilmore, Rick Parashar, and Howie Beno
 Co-produced by Corey Lowery
 Mixed by Jay Baumgardner
 All interludes by Howie Beno
 Executive producer John B. Davis
 A&R administration Tra Fraizer and Racquel Boothe
 Artwork by Dave Bett, and Joey Zampella
 Photography by Daniel Hastings
 Digital imaging by Sanches Stanfield
 Written by C. Lowery, E. Rogers, D. Richardson, J. Zampella, J. Fattoruso

Charts

Album
Billboard (North America)

Singles
Billboard charts (North America)

References

2001 debut albums
Columbia Records albums
Stereomud albums
Loud Records albums
Albums produced by Rick Parashar
Albums produced by Corey Lowery